Kyee Myint Saw (born 1939) is a painter from Myanmar. His paintings invoke the various hues of typical Myanmar colours under the tropical sun.

Early life  
Myint Saw was born in 1939 in Yangon, Myanmar. He graduated with B.Sc. (Maths)  in 1966 and M.Sc. (Maths) in 1990 at Yangon University .

References

Living people
1939 births
Burmese painters
Burmese performance artists